Vertical Submarine is a collective group of artists based in Singapore.  The group, founded by Justin Loke, Joshua Yang and Fiona Koh was formed in 2003 and the name was taken from a word subvert that is rotated to be vert-sub and expanded to form Vertical Submarine. The group has been appearing in local exhibitions of intricate installations involving everyday objects, text and an acquired sense of humor. 

The group won the Singapore President's Young Talents Award of 2009. Vertical Submarine will participate in ROUNDTABLE: The 9th Gwangju Biennale, which takes place September 7 – November 11, 2012 in Gwangju, Korea.

Exhibitions

Selected exhibitions

Penetrations 

Taking a playful stance on otherwise serious discussions of language policies and identity in Singapore, the series of work by Vertical Submarine exercises a tongue-in-cheek preservation of quickly disappearing pockets of colloquial conversation among Singaporeans. Despite the gradual loss of vernacular language, the presence of lyrical rhymes recited in the local Hokkien dialect still stands as endearing figures of expression in Singapore. The collective’s tribute to the unique verbal vestiges of the local dialect culture is sold to audiences via a selection of rhyming verses presented in forms archetypal of olden-day advertisements and illustrations.  Presented at Chan Hampe Galleries, Singapore.

Planting Shadows 

In Singapore Botanic Gardens they created an in-situ installation, Planting Shadows consisting of a patch of gray sunflowers in the middle of the garden. It comes with a small note at the bottom referring to Chien Swee-Teng’s poem about a sunflower plantation owner’s pact with a bottle imp where he gives up his sense of color for the success of his business. 
But there is a hidden twist to this exhibit: There is no Chien Swee-Teng or poem – the collective invented the writer and his poem about avarice.

Analogic 
Analogic, is an antithetical exhibition by Vertical Submarine. The title, Analogic with prefix ANA- means “against”, suggests a frivolity, nonsensical exercise of wit.
Exhibition Text:“Vertical Submarine’s ANALOGIC features a series of paintings inspired by the concept of analogy and its proximity to the past as expounded in Umberto Eco’s novel, Foucault’s Pendulum. In the exhibition, the paintings are presented as image sequences of related words, concepts and objects. Based on Eco’s concept of tying things up and linking seemingly diverse and unrelated concepts into one work, Vertical Submarine delves into an exploration of ‘analogy’ and ‘analogue’, creating in the process a nostalgic act of journeying back to the analogue era.”

Flirting Point 
Flirting Point  is a lighthearted satire of the behavior of Singaporeans and their culture. Singapore living is generally perceived as being so restricted and regulated. Therefore this work is trying to suggest that even flirting has to be restricted to a designated area.

A View With A Room 
This exhibition is done by the collective group as part of the Singapore's Young Talents Awards. A View With A Room is an  installation that presents a continuation of Vertical Submarine’s earlier inquiries into the relationship between text, image and representation. In particular, their installation explores the process of translating words into images, in the viewers’ as well as the artists’ imaginations, which are then realized in three-dimensional form.

Awards 
 Singapore President's Young Talents Award  The group won this award based on their exhibition at Singapore Art Museum 8Q, titled A View With A Room. As part of the award, sponsored by Credit Suisse, the group will go for a residency at Pasaguero. It is a venue for Mexican contemporary art, music and fashion located in Mexico City, Mexico. Their work is still up for viewing until 27 December 2010.

Controversy 
In September 2014, Vertical Submarine's exhibition Eville at the Singapore Night Festival drew protest from animal welfare groups after flyers urging people to “kill stray cats” were taken out of context. The flyer was in fact part of a satirical performance-exhibition against evil acts, commissioned by the Singapore Kindness Movement. The art group issued a statement saying, “The flyers were not distributed to the public for the purpose of advocacy but scattered as part of the performance. We do not advocate or condone the killing of stray cats. On the contrary, we are pleased that the issue of cat abuse is highlighted". The animal welfare groups subsequently apologised for posting the flyers on their social media platforms.

References

External links 
 Vertical Submarine Official Website
 Vertical Submarine various photos

Singaporean artist groups and collectives
Singaporean art